The French surname Jadin derives from the give name Gérard. It is common especially in Lorraine and Picardie. Notable people with the name include:
 Hyacinthe Jadin, French composer and pianist
 Louis-Emmanuel Jadin, French composer, violinist, harpsichordist, pianist, and teacher
 Louis Godefroy Jadin, French painter
 Paul Jadin, mayor of Green Bay, Wisconsin

See also
 Jayden (disambiguation), includes people with the given name Jadin
 Yadin (disambiguation)